Noley Thornton is a former television and film actress who was active in U.S. media from 1990 through 1998.

In the early 1990s, Thornton was nominated for a Young Artist Award twice. Once in the category of "Best Youth Actress in a TV Miniseries, Movie-of-the-Week, or TV Movie” for her lead role as the title character of the Disney Channel mini-series Heidi  (1993) and the following year in the category “Best Performance: Young Actress in a TV Comedy Series" at the 16th Youth in Film Awards for her starring role in The Martin Short Show.

Filmography

References

External links
 

20th-century American actresses
American film actresses
American television actresses
American child actresses
Living people
Year of birth missing (living people)
21st-century American women